is a national highway connecting Takasaki, Gunma and Joetsu, Niigata in Japan. A section of the highway is designated as a part of the Japan Romantic Road.

Route data
Length: 193.9 km (120.5 mi)
Origin: Takasaki, Gunma (originates at junction with National Route 17)
Terminus: Jōetsu, Niigata (ends at Junction with National Route 8 and National Route 350)
Major cities: Komoro, Ueda, Chikuma, Nagano

History
4 December 1952 - First Class National Highway 18 (from Takasaki to Joetsu)
1 April 1965 - General National Highway 18 (from Takasaki to Joetsu)

Municipalities passed through
Gunma Prefecture
Takasaki - Annaka
Nagano Prefecture
Karuizawa - Miyota - Komoro - Tomi - Ueda - Sakaki - Chikuma - Nagano - Obuse - Nagano - Iizuna - Shinano
Niigata Prefecture
Myōkō - Jōetsu - Myōkō - Jōetsu

Intersects with

Gunma Prefecture
Routes 17, 354 and 406; at Takasaki City
Nagano Prefecture
Route 146; at Karuizawa Town
Route 141; at Komoro City - Ueda City
Routes 143, 144 and 152; at Ueda City
 Route 403; at Chikuma City
 Routes 19, 117 and 406; at Nagano City
 Niigata Prefecture
 Route 292; at Myoko City
 Route 405; at Joetsu City
 Routes 8 and 350; at the terminus in Joetsu City

Bypasses
Among other sections already finished, a bypass running on the west side of the Chikuma River from the extreme southern part of Nagano City to Ueda is currently under construction.  As of 2008, only a small amount of sections of this bypass has been completed.  The completed sections are in Ueda, just west of the Chikuma River, and in Chikuma from Inariyama to just south of Yawata.

References

018
Roads in Gunma Prefecture
Roads in Nagano Prefecture
Roads in Niigata Prefecture